Eyde is a Norwegian surname.

Notable people
Notable people with this surname include:
 Edith Eyde (born 1921), American author that uses the pen name Lisa Ben
 Joakim Eyde (born 1991), Norwegian footballer (no) (it)
 Sam Eyde (1866–1940), Norwegian engineer and industrialist

References